Fort Frames s.r.o. is a Czech bicycle manufacturer based in Ústí nad Orlicí in Pardubický kraj.

Fort Frames was founded in 1992. One of the founders was the four-time Czech cross-country winner Radovan Fort. Forts name was adopted for the brand of the company. Fort Frames is specialized in small series (5 to 100 frames per size). Since a high degree of automation is not economical with the small quantities, Fort still carries out many production steps by hand.

References

Mountain bike manufacturers
Czech companies established in 1999
Czech brands